Valley in the Clouds is the debut album by David Arkenstone, released in 1987. Much of his trademark compositional style is already evident.

Track listing
"Ancient Legend" – 3:54
"Stepping Stars" – 3:45
"Valley in the Clouds" – 3:35
"Princess" – 3:32
"Eastern Dream" – 4:49
"Night Wind" – 3:56
"Rain" – 5:41
"The Sun Girl" – 4:37
"Lost Temple" – 6:43
 All tracks composed by David Arkenstone

Personnel
 David Arkenstone – keyboards, grand piano, guitar, harp, fretless bass
 Daniel Chase – organic and electronic percussion

References

1987 debut albums
David Arkenstone albums
Narada Productions albums